Heroes Wear Red (abbreviated as HWR) is a rock band formed in Johannesburg, South Africa in 2006. The band, which was founded by bass player Gavin Wienand and vocalist Tim Kroon, is currently signed to Musketeer Records.  Originally named Bloodmoney, the band changed their name in 2007, coinciding with the release of their debut album Surviving September. In 2008, Heroes Wear Red independently released Surviving September, which was co-produced by Rae DiLeo, who has worked with such artists as Filter, Veruca Salt, Henry Rollins, and Grand Master Flash. The band's first hit single, Beautiful Way, received favourable reviews from many social media outlets throughout South Africa, including maintaining the number one position on 5FM's Vodafone Hi5@5, for the seven consecutive weeks following that song's release.

Band members 

Current Members

Tim Kroon - vocals (2006–present)
Gavin Wienand - bass (2006–present)
Tumi Mothei - guitar
Rob Storm - drums (2008–present)

Former Members
Lorne McGregor
Garth McLeod

Discography 
Studio albums
Bloodmoney EP (2006)
Surviving September (2008)
Harkener (2018)

References

External links
 
 
Interview from More Than Music
Interview from M-NET:Studio 1.
HWR's No.1 Single (powerzone)
HWR & Rae DiLeo (powerzone)
SAMusic.co.za article
Powerzone speaks to Rae DiLeo about HWR's album
MyVideo talks to HWR about name change

South African alternative rock groups